Carabus montivagus montivagus is a subspecies of beetle from family Carabidae, found in Bulgaria, Greece, Hungary, Italy, North Macedonia, Romania, Slovakia, Yugoslavia, and  European part of Turkey.

References

montivagus montivagus
Beetles described in 1825